Kakhaber Nodarovich Mzhavanadze (born 2 October 1978) is a Georgian former football defender.

Career 
Kahaber over his career has played for Shukura Kobuleti, Dinamo Batumi, both in Georgia. In 2001, he moved to Russian giants Spartak Moscow, although appearing only 6 times for the club he was part of the league winning team that season. He moved to Anzhi the next season and had an extended spell with them. He joined FC Chornomorets Odesa, in January 2006. The defender was released on a free transfer by Chornomorets in January 2009, and had a trial with FC Rostov before eventually signing with FC Dacia Chişinău, who play in the Moldovan National Division.

International 
Mzhavanadze was also a member of Georgian National Football Team.

References

External links 
 Chornomorets Official Website Profile
 Profile on EUFO
 
 Sport.ru
 Stats on Odessa Football page

1978 births
Living people
People from Kobuleti
Footballers from Georgia (country)
Georgia (country) international footballers
FC Spartak Moscow players
FC Chornomorets Odesa players
FC Anzhi Makhachkala players
FC Dinamo Batumi players
FC Dacia Chișinău players
Shamakhi FK players
FC Shukura Kobuleti players
Expatriate footballers in Moldova
Expatriate footballers in Ukraine
Expatriate footballers in Russia
Expatriate footballers from Georgia (country)
Expatriate sportspeople from Georgia (country) in Moldova
Russian Premier League players
Ukrainian Premier League players
Expatriate sportspeople from Georgia (country) in Ukraine
Association football defenders
Expatriate sportspeople from Georgia (country) in Azerbaijan